This is a list of notable alumni of St Edmund Hall, Oxford, one of the constituent colleges of University of Oxford, and informally known as Teddy Hall. The overwhelming maleness of this list is partially explained by the fact that for roughly 95% of its history (from its foundation in 1278 until 1979), women were barred from studying at the college.
See also :Category:Alumni of St Edmund Hall, Oxford.

Dan Abnett, author, comic book writer
Samira Ahmed, radio news presenter 
John Arnway, English royalist divine
Lionel Barber, journalist and editor of the Financial Times
Stuart Barnes, England and British Lions rugby player, 1984–1993; commentator for Sky Sports from 1994
Bidisha, writer and commentator on cultural and social affairs
Steve Blinkhorn, psychologist, psychometrician
Anna Botting, newsreader
Douglas Botting, explorer and author
Emma Brockes, journalist
Sir Stanley Burnton, Lord Justice of Appeal, 2008–2015
John Camkin, journalist, television sports broadcaster and businessman
Maggie Carver, businesswoman
David Cooksey, businessman, venture capitalist and politician
Jeremy Davies, Catholic priest and exorcist
Peter Day, broadcaster
Robin Day, broadcaster
Nicholas Evans, English screenwriter and journalist
Paul Farrelly, Labour MP for Newcastle-under-Lyme, 2001–2019
Mark Field, Conservative MP for the Cities of London and Westminster, 2001–2019
Amelia Fletcher, economist and musician
Stuart Ford, film producer, CEO of IM Global
Scott Frandsen, Canadian rower, 2003 Oxford Blue and Olympic medallist
Arihiro Fukuda, associate professor of the University of Tokyo
Patrick Garland, theatre director (Honorary Fellow) 
David Gauke, Conservative MP for South West Hertfordshire, 2005–2019; Lord High Chancellor of Great Britain, 2018–2019
Ivan Gazidis, Chief Executive of Arsenal F.C., 2009–2018; Chief Executive of A.C. Milan, 2018–present
Darren Gerard, cricketer
Amitav Ghosh, writer
Matt Golder, political scientist
Timothy Gorringe, professor of theology
Sir Richard Gozney, career diplomat; Governor and Commander-in-Chief of Bermuda, 2007–2012; Lieutenant Governor of the Isle of Man, 2016–2021
Geoffrey Grigson, poet and critic
Alice Hart-Davis, journalist
Thomas Hearne, antiquarian and diarist
Robert Sparke Hutchings, clergyman, school founder and Bible translator
Robert Jackson, Conservative, later Labour, politician MEP for Upper Thames, 1979–1984; MP for Wantage, 1983–2005
Terry Jones, comedic actor and writer
Gabriel Josipovici, novelist and playwright
Emma Kennedy, comic actress and writer
Salman Khurshid, Indian politician; Minister of External Affairs, 2012–2014
Stewart Lee, comedian and writer
Yann Lovelock, writer and interfaith worker
 Rob Macaire, diplomat
William MacAskill, philosopher
Ken Macdonald, Baron Macdonald of River Glaven, Warden of Wadham College, Oxford, 2012–2021; Director of Public Prosecutions, 2003–2008
Hugo MacNeill, Ireland and British Lions rugby player, 1981–1988
Bongbong Marcos (special diploma recipient), Filipino politician; 17th President of the Philippines, from 2022
Kayleigh McEnany, American political commentator and former White House Press Secretary, 2020–2021
Hugh McManners, author and journalist
John McManners, ecclesiastical historian
Jude Cowan Montague, artist, musician, writer
Derek Morris, economist; provost of Oriel College, Oxford, 2003–2013
Rudrangshu Mukherjee, Indian historian; chancellor of Ashoka University, from 2017; former opinion editor of The Telegraph, Calcutta
Al Murray, comedian
Richard Onslow, 1st Baron Onslow, Whig politician; Speaker of the House of Commons, 1708–1710; Chancellor of the Exchequer, 1714–1715 
Oronhyatekha, Mohawk physician and scholar
Andrew Peach, BBC Radio 4 presenter
Littleton Powys, Justice of the King's Bench, 1701–1726
Larry Pressler, Chairman of the Senate Committee on Commerce, Science and Transportation, 1995–1997; United States Senator for South Dakota, 1979–1997; Member of the United States House of Representatives for South Dakota's 1st congressional district, 1975–1979
Nicholas Pumfrey (Lord Justice Pumfrey), Court of Appeal Judge
Sophy Ridge, television political journalist
Charles Ritcheson, historian, diplomat and university administrator
P. G. D. Robbins, England rugby union player, 1956–1962
Michael Scott Rohan, writer
Myron Rolle, neurosurgeon and ex-NFL player for the Tennessee Titans, 2010–2011 and Pittsburgh Steelers, 2012
Edward P.F. Rose, paleontologist and geologist
General Hugh Michael Rose (Mike Rose), British Army officer and Queen's Gallantry Medal recipient
Mark Sedwill, diplomat
M. J. K. Smith, cricketer
John Spellar, Labour MP for Birmingham Northfield, 1982–1983; MP for Warley West, later Warley, from 1992
Sir Keir Starmer, Leader of the Opposition and Leader of the Labour Party from 2020; MP for Holborn and St Pancras from 2015; Director of Public Prosecutions, 2008–2013 
Graham Steele, Minister of Finance of Nova Scotia, 2009–2012; Nova Scotia New Democratic Party Member of the Nova Scotia House of Assembly for Halifax Fairview (now Halifax Armdale), 2001–2013
Mel Stride, Leader of the House of Commons, May–July 2019; Conservative MP for Central Devon, from 2010
Jenny Taylor, professor of genomic medicine at the University of Oxford
Nick Thomas-Symonds, Shadow Secretary of State for International Trade, from 2021; Labour MP for Torfaen, from 2015
Ronny Tong, Hong Kong Senior Counsel and politician
Frank Vandenbroucke, Belgian politician; Minister of Foreign Affairs, 1994–1995; Minister of Health and Social Affairs, from 2020
Faith Wainwright, one of the first female engineering graduates, structural engineer and Honorary Fellow of St Edmund Hall, Oxford
Piers Wardle, artist
John Wells, comic actor and translator
John West, missionary
Kristof Willerton, gymnast 
Daniel Wilson, bishop of Calcutta, 1832–1858
Peter Winch, philosopher
Terry Wyatt , professor of physics at the University of Manchester

References 

St Edmund Hall, Oxford
 
St Edmund Hall